The Nellie massacre took place in central Assam during a six-hour period in the morning of 18 February 1983. The massacre claimed the lives of 1,600–2,000 people from 14 villages—Alisingha, Khulapathar, Basundhari, Bugduba Beel, Bugduba Habi, Borjola, Butuni, Dongabori, Indurmari, Mati Parbat, Muladhari, Mati Parbat no. 8, Silbheta, Borburi and Nellie—of Nagaon district. The victims were Muslim peasants of East Bengal origin. Three media personnel—Hemendra Narayan of Indian Express, Bedabrata Lahkar of Assam Tribune and Sharma of ABC—were witnesses to the massacre.

The violence that took place in Nellie by natives—mostly rural peasants—was seen as a fallout of the decision to hold the controversial state elections in 1983 in the midst of the Assam Agitation, after Indira Gandhi's decision to give 4 million immigrants from Bangladesh the right to vote. It has been described as one of the worst pogroms since World War II.

A documentary, What the Fields Remember, has been produced by Public Service Broadcasting Trust.

Context

In 1978, Lok Sabha member Hiralal Patwari died, necessitating a by-election in the Mangaldoi Lok Sabha Constituency. During the process of the election it was noticed that the electorate had grown phenomenally. Investigation revealed that there had been mass inclusion of alleged illegal migrants. The All Assam Students Union (AASU) demanded that the elections be postponed until the names of "foreign nationals" were deleted from the electoral rolls. The AASU subsequently launched an agitation to compel the government to identify and expel allegedly illegal immigrants.

The ethnic clash that took place in Nellie was seen as a fallout of the decision to hold the controversial Assembly elections in 1983 (boycotted by the AASU) despite stiff opposition from several elements in the state. Police officials had suggested to hold the polls in phases in order to avoid violence. According to then Assam Inspector General of Police, KPS Gill, there were 63 constituencies, where elections could have been held without any trouble. Among the rest, the Assam police had declared there were 23 constituencies where it was "impossible to hold any election." Nellie was cited as one of the "troubled" spots before the elections.

400 companies of Central paramilitary force and 11 brigades of the Indian Army were deployed to guard Assam while the polls were scheduled to take place in phases.

Result

The official Tiwari Commission report on the Nellie massacre is still a closely guarded secret (only three copies exist). The 600-page report was submitted to the Assam Government in 1984 and the Congress Government (headed by Hiteswar Saikia) decided not to make it public, and subsequent Governments followed suit. Assam United Democratic Front and others are making legal efforts to make Tiwari Commission report public, so that reasonable justice is delivered to victims, at least after 25 years after the incident.

Police filed 688 criminal cases, of which 378 cases were closed due to "lack of evidence" and 310 cases were slated to be charged. However, all these cases were dropped by the Government of India as a part of the 1985 Assam Accord; and, as a result, not a single person received punishment.

Prime Minister Rajiv Gandhi signed the Assam Accord with the leaders of the AASU to formally end the Assam Agitation in 1985.

See also
Nellie, 1983
List of massacres in India
1984 anti-Sikh riots

References

Sources

Further reading

News sources

Books
 Deka, Lakhi, (2107) Tirakhir Sahid (in Assamese) Shristi Publication.
 Chadha, Vivek, Low Intensity Conflicts in India. Sage Publications, 2005.
 Saksena, N.S. "Police and Politicians" in Alexander, P.J. (ed.) Policing India in the New Millennium. Allied Publishers, 2002.

External links
 25 years on..Nellie Still haunts..., Hemendra Narayan. (Contains an eyewitness account.)

1980s in Assam
Conflicts in 1983
Nagaon
Mass murder in 1983
Religiously motivated violence in India
February 1983 events in Asia
Asom Gana Parishad
1983 murders in India
 
Massacres of Bengalis in Assam
Massacres of Bengalis